Margit Gréczi (born 13 December 1941 in Gyöngyös) is a Hungarian painter.

Career 

She began to show interest in painting in her early childhood. Her art teacher, Gyuláné Békési at the Gyöngyösi Elementary School, spotted her talent and started to work with her towards becoming a professional painter. She took lessons from her teacher for many years.

After finishing Gyöngyösi Elementary School she applied to the Hungarian Art Gymnasium at Budapest where she got accepted. So she continued her studies there until the 1956 incidents interfered, when her parents called her home to Gyöngyös, because they were worried about her safety at Budapest. At Gyöngyös as there were no art schools, she started to go to Vak Bottyán János Economic Technikum. After that, she has done another three years of higher school, when she received her accountant qualification. She started working as an accountant at the Treasury Department of the City of Gyöngyös.

She continued painting during all these years. She has also learned a lot from hunt scenery painters, and few others who effected her style and techniques. Most of her work is oil painting. She paints portraits, landscapes, and still life, and one of her favorite subjects is hunt scenery and animal paintings. She also paints for order, such as pet portraits, family portraits, and landscapes. She became a member of the Gyöngyösi Art Club in 1966. Her works can be found all over the world at professional collectors in the United States, UK, Germany, France and Netherlands. In 2010 she won the Amateur Painter contest with her "Cirinke" titled painting.

Painter's Camp 
Since 2009 she attends Painter's Camps in Hungary and England yearly. Beside painting she also teaches painting to the young painters there.
 2009. Székelyvarság, Hungary
 2009. Adács, Hungary
 2009. Mátra Sástó, Hungary
 2010. Anglia, Bristol, England
 2010. Mezőbergenyei Art Camp, Hungary
 2010. Mátra Sástó, Hungary

Solo exhibition 
 1996–2010. Gyöngyös Main Square Gallery, Hungary
 2002. Tiszaszentimre Sumer Hunting Days, Hungary
 2003. Mátrafüred Gallery, Hungary
 2004. Gyöngyös Mátra Honvéd Casino Gallery, Hungary
 2007. Debrecen DOTE Mini Gallery, Hungary
 2009. Gyula Cukrász Museum (100 years anniversary), Hungary
 2009. Gyula Elizabet Hotel Gallery, Hungary
 2010. Telki Pipacs Gallery, Hungary
 2010. Domoszló, Atkár, Gyöngyöshalász, Gyöngyös Exhibitions, Hungary

Gallery

References 
 festomuvesz.hu: Gréczi Margit festményei
 kepafalon.hu: Lángné Gréczi Margit - festőmüvész

1941 births
Living people
Hungarian painters
Hungarian women painters
20th-century Hungarian women artists
21st-century Hungarian women artists